Gong Jing Dan, Gongjindan,Gongjin-dan (GJD) or 공진단 is a traditional Korean multi-herbal medicine used for disorders of the central nervous system.

History
 First recorded at Se-eui-deuk-hyo-bang  (세의득효방, 世醫得效方) by Ui, Yeoklim (위역림, 危亦林)
 Dongui Bogam (동의보감, 東醫寶鑑) by Heo, Jun (허준)
'Dong-Eui-Bo-Gam (Korea's medical book) describes 'Gong-Jin-Dan' as follows:

 Dongui Suse bowon (동의수세보원 東醫壽世保元)  by Lee, Jema (이제마)
 Bangyakhapyun (방약합편) by Hwang, Dohyun (황도현)
 Professor Seyoung Ahn at Kyunghui University

Claims of efficacy
 Sexual hypofunction and infertility
 Hepatic hypofunction caused by excessive stress and over drinking
 Chronic fatigue and physical decline 
 Overwork and exhaustion
 Blood circulatory disorder and physical depression 
 Constitutional infirmity 
 Aging (preventive) and various diseases 
 Hypersensitivity and somnipathy
 Postoperative enervation
 Paralysis (preventive) 
 Hyposexuality, impotence and premature ejaculation
 Sexual hypofunction and physical enervation (female)

Ingredients and claims of effectiveness
 'Sa-Hyang (Musk)': It is effective to unblock energy. Externally it reaches the skin, and internally reaches the bone marrow.
 'Nok-Yong (Antler)': It is effective to keep positive energy, sperm and the bone marrow healthy, as well as to strengthen bones and muscles.
 'Dang-Gwi (Largeteeth Ostericum) ': It is effective for hematopoiesis and blood circulation. It regularizes menstrual cycles, and alleviates dysmenorrhea. Also, it relieves constipation.
 'San-Su-Yu (Japanese Cornel) ': It stimulates negative energy and helps create sperm. Also, it energizes the genital organs and improves erection quality and frequency. In addition, it warms the waist and knees.

Research
There is a research that described the multi-herbal medicine Gongjin-dan enhances memory and learning tasks via NGF regulation. 
Abstract
The effects of Gongjin-Dan(GJD) on NGF mimetic activity in PC12 cells and the induction of NGF secretion in primary astrocytes. Moreover, we also measured neuron survival by MAP-2 staining in an immobilization stress rat model and induction of long-term potentiation by the MEA system in rat hippocampus slices treated with dexamethasone.

The behavioral syndrome by novel object test was also performed in mice. GJD increased neurite outgrowth in PC12 cells and NGF secretion in primary astrocytes. Also, it reduced neuronal cell death and increased long-term potentiation in the rat hippocampus. Moreover, the number of entries, the time spent and the distance moved in the center area of the test region by the mice was increased by oral administration of GJD in comparison with the distance moved over the total area. These data suggest that administration of GJD may improve memory and learning tasks via NGF regulation, and that it may have a potential for multiple function neuroprotection via NGF regulation.

References

Traditional medicine